Justicia japonica is a flowering plant species in the genus Justicia.

References

External links
 Justicia japonica on www.efloras.org

japonica
Plants described in 1784